John Leonard Eatwell, Baron Eatwell, (born 2 February 1945) is a British economist who was President of Queens' College, Cambridge, from 1996 to 2020. A former senior advisor to the Labour Party, Lord Eatwell sat in the House of Lords as a non-affiliated peer from 2014 to 2020, before returning to the Labour bench.

Early life and education
Eatwell was born on 2 February 1945. He was educated at Headlands Grammar School in Swindon in Wiltshire. He studied at Queens' College, Cambridge, graduating with a Bachelor of Arts (BA) degree in 1967: as per tradition, his BA was promoted to a Master of Arts (MA Cantab) degree in 1971. As a Kennedy Scholar, he studied at Harvard University and graduated with a Doctor of Philosophy (PhD) degree in 1975.

Career

Academic career

While studying for his doctorate at Harvard University, Eatwell was a teaching fellow in the Harvard Graduate School of Arts and Sciences from 1968 to 1969 and a research fellow at Queens' College, Cambridge, from 1969 to 1970. In 1970, he was elected a Fellow of Trinity College, Cambridge, and would stay with the college for the next 36 years. Having completed his doctorate in 1975, he was an assistant lecturer (1975–1977) and then lecturer (1977–2002) in the University of Cambridge's Faculty of Economics and Politics. He was additionally a visiting professor in economics at the New School for Social Research in New York City from 1982 to 1996. He was President of Queens' College, Cambridge, from 1997 to 2020, and Professor of Financial Policy at the Cambridge Judge Business School from 2002 to 2012.

In May 2014, Lord Eatwell was appointed Chair of the Advisory Board of the Institute for Policy Research (IPR) at the University of Bath.

Political career
Eatwell was chief economic adviser to Neil Kinnock, the then-Leader of the Labour Party, from 1985 to 1992. 

He was created a life peer as Baron Eatwell, of Stratton St Margaret in the County of Wiltshire, on 14 July 1992, and joined the House of Lords as a Labour peer. From 1992 to 1993, he was the opposition spokesman on Treasury affairs, and on trade and industry. He served as Principal Opposition spokesman on Treasury and economic affairs in the House of Lords from 1993 to 1997.

In 2010, he was appointed a Labour Opposition Spokesman for the Treasury in the House of Lords by former leader Ed Miliband. From 27 March 2014 to 23 April 2020, he sat as a non-affiliated peer. Once more sitting as a Labour peer, he has served on the Lords Industry and Regulators Committee since 14 April 2021.

Other works
Eatwell is the former director of the Royal Opera House and the economic advisor to the Chartered Management Institute. He was chair of CRUSAID, an HIV/AIDS charity, from 1993 to 1998, and of the British Library Board from 2001 to 2006.

Personal life

In July 2006, Eatwell married Suzi Digby, founder and Principal of The Voices Foundation, a national music education charity. Prior to this he was married to Hélène Seppain, with whom he has three children, the Hon. Nikolai Eatwell (a partner at Clifford Chance), the Hon Vladimir Eatwell (a software developer), and the Hon. Tatyana Eatwell (a barrister).

Selected bibliography

Books

Chapters in books 
 
 
 
 
 
 
 
 
 
 
  Pdf version.

Journal articles 
 
 
 
 
  (Originally printed in Ekonomiska in 1973.)
 
 
 
 
 
 
 
 
 
  Pdf version.

Papers 
 Eatwell, John; Ellman, Michael; Karlsson, Mats; Nuti Mario; and Shapiro, Judith. (1997) Not 'just another accession': the political economy of EU enlargement to the East. London: Institute for Public Policy Research.
 Eatwell, John and Taylor, Lance (2000) Capital flows and the international financial architecture: a paper from the Project on Development, Trade, and International Finance. New York, NY: Council on Foreign Relations Press.
 Eatwell, John; Ellman, Michael; Karlsson, Mats; Nuti Mario; and Shapiro, Judith. (2000) Hard budgets and soft states: social policy choices in central and eastern Europe. London: Institute for Public Policy Research.
 Eatwell, John; Alexander, Kern; Persaud, Avinash; and Reoch, Robert. (2007) Financial supervision and crisis management in the EU. Brussels: European Parliament Committee on Economic and Monetary Affairs.

Arms

References

External links 

 They Work For You profile
 Professor John Eatwell more information
 Professor Lord Eatwell Director of CERF
 Queens' College

1945 births
Living people
Alumni of Queens' College, Cambridge
Fellows of Trinity College, Cambridge
Fellows of Queens' College, Cambridge
Presidents of Queens' College, Cambridge
British economists
Post-Keynesian economists
Harvard University alumni
Kennedy Scholarships
Labour Party (UK) life peers
Life peers created by Elizabeth II